Monkey Plot (initiated in 2011) is a Norwegian jazz trio playing acoustic improvised music with their own touch.

Biography 

After four years of study at the Norwegian Academy of Music, the trio have distinguished themselves as strong newcomers on the Norwegian jazz scene. They released their debut album Løv Og Lette Vimpler in 2013. The album was recorded in Stavanger, in the studio of Norwegian free jazz pioneer Frode Gjerstad. He has succeeded in capturing the simple, acoustic and intimate sound, of the trio and the free-spirited structure of its pieces, blending organic guitar improvisation with clear references to the ECM recordings of Ralph Towner.

Monkey Plot has a modern and original expression that does not sound like anything else. They have a seeking approach with a tranquility and strong individual voices. The band has come a long way in developing its own musical language and being true to their own universe. The musicians exude confidence and have a distinct presence in the music that creates a strong sense of communication and interaction. The trio has a compelling approach to improvisation.

Band members 
Christian Skår Winther – acoustic guitar
Magnus Skavhaug Nergaard – upright bass
Jan Martin Gismervik – drums and percussion

Honors 
2014: Jazzintro award at Moldejazz

Discography 
2013: Løv Og Lette Vimpler (Gigafon Records)
2015: Angående Omstendigheter Som Ikke Lar Seg Nedtegne (Hubro)
2016: Here I Sit, Knowing All Of This (Hubro)

References

External links 

Norwegian jazz ensembles
Norwegian experimental musical groups
Musical groups established in 2011
2011 establishments in Norway
Musical groups from Oslo
Hubro Music artists